Lake Bolluk is a lake in Turkey.

It is situated to the east of the highway , which connects Ankara to Silifke and to the west of Lake Tuz. The hard water of the lake contains sodium. Rrecently, there are two threats to lake; the underground water level falls as a result of excessive irrigation and the creeks, which feed the lake, are polluted. World Water Forum Turkey conducts a project to protect the lake.

Fauna
Slender billed gull, Mediterranean gull, gull-billed tern, greater sand plover,
spoonbill, black-winged stilt, and avocet are the birds of the lake.

References
	

Bolluk
Bolluk
Important Bird Areas of Turkey